The Officer's Swordknot (Hungarian: A Tiszti kardbojt) is a 1915 Hungarian silent romance film directed by Alexander Korda and starring Gábor Rajnay, Mici Haraszti and Ödön Pajor

Cast
 Gábor Rajnay
 Mici Haraszti
 Ödön Pajor
 Irén Gombaszögi
 Jenő Horváth
 Lajos Szőke
 Ili Vörbös
 Gyula Féher

Bibliography
 Kulik, Karol. Alexander Korda: The Man Who Could Work Miracles. Virgin Books, 1990.

External links

1915 films
Hungarian silent films
Hungarian romance films
1910s Hungarian-language films
Films directed by Alexander Korda
Hungarian black-and-white films
1910s romance films
Austro-Hungarian films